Amanda Paige Frisbie (born May 29, 1992) is an American professional soccer player who plays as a defender. She has previously played for Boston Breakers, Seattle Reign, Western New York Flash,  FC Kansas City, Sky Blue FC of the NWSL, Stjarnan Women of the Úrvalsdeild kvenna league in Iceland, and Perth Glory in the Australian W-League.

Early life
Born and raised in North Richland Hills, Texas, a suburb located approximately 35 minutes west of Dallas, Frisbie attended McKinney High School where she played soccer her freshman and sophomore years before dedicating her time fully to club team, the Dallas Texans. With the Texans, Frisbie won consecutive state cup championships from 2008–09 and three league championships from 2007–09. During her freshman year at McKinney, she led the freshmen on the team with 14 goals and eight assists. The team won the district championship and Frisbie was named the team and district most valuable player. During her sophomore year, her 27 goals and 17 assists set a new single-season record. She was named to the 2007 State All-Region Team, 2008 NSCAA Youth All-Region Team, and ESPN RISE All-Area Team in 2009 and 2010.

From 2005 to 2009, Frisbie played for the North Texas State Team and participated in the regional Olympic Development Program (ODP). She helped the team win a regional championship as well as the United States Youth Soccer Association national championship in 2009.

University of Portland
Frisbie attended the University of Portland from 2010 to 2013, where she played soccer for the Portland Pilots. She scored her first career goal during a match against the University of Washington during her freshman season and finished the year having scored five goals in five shots. During her sophomore year, her three game-winning goals tied for the team lead. During her junior season, she started all 21 games and led the West Coast Conference (WCC) in goals (12) and points (33). Her nine assists also tied for the lead. During the team's 5–0 defeat of Fresno State, Frisbie scored four goals and became the 16th player in the team's history to do so.

During her senior year, Frisbie was a Hermann Trophy semifinalist and was named the 2013 WCC Defender of the Year after moving to the center back position from forward. She helped the team record nine shutouts and finished second on the team with eight goals, four of them game-winning goals. Frisbie was named the WCC's Women's Soccer Play of the Week for the week of September 30, 2013 after scoring three goals, including two game-winning goals and providing an assist. She was named a semifinalist for the Hermann Trophy. During a National Women's Soccer League pre-season match against the Portland Thorns FC, Frisbie scored the first goal of the match during the collegiate team's 2–1 defeat to the professional team.

Club

Seattle Reign FC, 2014
On January 17, 2014, Frisbie was selected in the first round (seventh overall pick) of the 2014 NWSL College Draft by Seattle Reign FC. Later that month, the Reign signed her to the team. Of her signing, head coach Laura Harvey said, "We wanted to sign Amanda early to demonstrate our commitment to helping her develop into a key part of our squad. I expect Amanda to be an integral part of our season in 2014 and believe she has the capacity to be an impact player in the league in the future." Frisbie missed the 2014 season due to injury, but was re-signed by the Reign for the 2015 season.

Western New York Flash, 2015
Frisbie was traded to the Western New York Flash on March 30, 2015 along with Sydney Leroux Dwyer for Amber Brooks and the rights to Abby Wambach.

FC Kansas City
Frisbie was traded to FC Kansas City in November 2015, was waived in July of the next year and immediately signed with Iceland's Stjarnan Women.

Stjarnan, 2016

Frisbie was signed to Stjarnan Women in July 2016 and helped lead the club back to a league championship in September.

Boston Breakers, 2017
It was announced on January 10, 2017 that Amanda Frisbie was signed as a discovery player by the Boston Breakers for the 2017 season. The team folded before the 2018 season.

Perth Glory, 2017–18
Frisbie was signed by Perth Glory for the 2017–18 W-League season, on loan from the Boston Breakers.

Sky Blue FC, 2018
Frisbie was the number nineteen draft pick by Sky Blue FC in the Breakers Dispersal Draft on January 30, 2018.

See also
 List of University of Portland alumni

References

External links
 Boston Breakers player profile
 Portland Pilots player profile
 

Living people
1992 births
American women's soccer players
OL Reign players
National Women's Soccer League players
Soccer players from Texas
Sportspeople from the Dallas–Fort Worth metroplex
Portland Pilots women's soccer players
Western New York Flash players
People from North Richland Hills, Texas
Women's association football defenders
FC Kansas City players
Boston Breakers players
Perth Glory FC (A-League Women) players
OL Reign draft picks
American expatriate sportspeople in Iceland
Expatriate women's footballers in Iceland
NJ/NY Gotham FC players
Klepp IL players